Luis Antonio Trillo, (born July 13, 1975) better known as Luigi Trillo is the former head coach of the Alaska Aces in the Philippine Basketball Association. He is also the former head coach  of the Cebuana Lhuillier Gems in the PBA D-League. Currently, he is the assistant coach of the Meralco Bolts.

Coaching career

Early years 
After suiting up for La Salle, Trillo did not play professionally. He first got the offer to coach for a private school for boys called Southridge in 1997.

After Southridge, he became a co-coach with Jorge Gallent in the junior Philippine Basketball League. He then got an offer as an assistant coach for the Cebu Gems in the now-defunct Metropolitan Basketball Association, where he went straight to the finals in his first year.

Adamson 
In 1999, he joined the Adamson Falcons and, at 23 years old, became the youngest head coach in the UAAP at the time. His inexperience showed as the Soaring Falcons did not win a game in his first two seasons with the team at 0-28.Those first two years were really trying times for me because, remember, you're inheriting a team that's in last place and then we had to recruit,", he said as he explained the early parts of his 4 and a half years with Adamson.

His hard work resulted in a UniGames title for Adamson. Although his time with Adamson wasn’t the brightest of years, it still remains just as significant to him because it made him “realize how tough coaching was.”

Alaska (Cone's assistant) 
While at Adamson, he was also offered by coach Tim Cone, who was then his neighbor, to be his assistant coach At Alaska, which he accepted. He juggled learning about coaching through the UAAP and with the Alaska franchise. He helped his team to steer 4 championships for the team.

Cebuana Lhullier 
After his stint with Adamson, he became head coach of the Cebuana Lhuillier Gems of the PBL in 2006, and of the PBA D-League in 2011.

Alaska 
In 2012, he left Cebuana and took over the coaching duties of Alaska, replacing Joel Banal. The Elasto Painters spoiled his debut in a score of 107–100 but the Aces recovered and won 104–84 on their game vs. Barako Bull Energy.

During the 2012–13 season (Trillo's first full season), he quite made an impression around the league by battling the eventual champions Talk N' Text Tropang Texters to six games during the 2012–13 PBA Philippine Cup semis.  In the 2013 PBA Commissioner's Cup, he helped the Aces win its 14th championship in franchise history, the first in the post-Tim Cone era.  His team also came within a game of ousting the eventual champion San Mig Coffee Mixers in the quarterfinals of the 2013 PBA Governors Cup. Because of his achievements, he was awarded as the 2012–13 PBA Coach of the Year by the PBA Press Corps.

Meralco (Black's assistant) 
Two games into the 2014 PBA Governors' Cup, he stepped down as head coach of Alaska. After taking a sabbatical, he took the job as an in-game analyst for Sports5, and eventually returned to coaching, this time as assistant to Norman Black at Meralco.

In July 6, 2022, he was appointed as interim coach while Norman Black was taking a leave. Trillo guided the team into a win against Rain or Shine. In July 31, 2022, he led the Bolts to defeat Barangay Ginebra in Game 3 of the best of three quarterfinals series. This is the first time that the team defeated Ginebra in a playoff series. He coached the team until August 3, 2022, when Black returned from overseas.

Coaching record

Collegiate record

PBA record

Personal life

Trillo is the son of former Alaska team manager/governor Joaqui Trillo. He is married to TV host and former courtside reporter, Ria Tanjuatco-Trillo. They have four children.

References

1975 births
Living people
De La Salle Green Archers basketball players
Filipino men's basketball coaches
Sportspeople from Manila
Adamson Soaring Falcons basketball coaches
Alaska Aces (PBA) coaches
Meralco Bolts coaches